Variations is a classical and rock fusion album.  The music was composed by Andrew Lloyd Webber and performed by his younger brother, the cellist Julian Lloyd Webber.

The Lloyd Webber brothers were always very close but their two different careers (a rock musical composer and a classical cellist) meant that a collaboration seemed unlikely. It was not until Julian beat his brother in a bet on a Leyton Orient football match that Andrew was forced to write his cello work.

As his subject, Andrew chose the theme of Paganini's 24th caprice and added 23 variations for cello and rock band. The work premiered at the 1977 Sydmonton Festival with rock band Colosseum II, featuring Gary Moore, Jon Hiseman and Don Airey being joined by Barbara Thompson (sax, flute), Rod Argent (piano, synthesizer, keyboards) and Julian Lloyd Webber (cello). It was subsequently rearranged and recorded in 1978. It reached Number 2 on the UK album charts.

The cover is based on the painting Frederick, Prince of Wales, and his sisters by Philip Mercier.

Adaptations 

The work was used in musical Song and Dance (1982) and David Cullen made an arrangement of the work for cello and orchestra. The opening and closing variations have been rewritten for cello and piano, the latter of which Julian often uses as an encore, due to its amusing glissando down to Bottom A (forcing a mid piece retune) to conclude.

The opening theme is used as the theme to The South Bank Show (1978–2010) and "Variation 5" became "Unexpected Song" with lyrics by Don Black.  "Variation 18" is an instrumental version of the title song from the first Rice and Webber musical, The Likes of Us (1965, unperformed until 2005). Also, the UK's children's  program, The Book Tower (hosted by Doctor Who actor, Tom Baker) adopted a section of "Variation 19" for its theme tune.

In Lloyd Webber's West End musical adaptation of the film School of Rock (2003), Dewey Finn and Ned Schneebly play Guitar Hero to the audience on an imaginary TV screen, and the Variations album is played. In addition, the chorus of the song "Stick it to the Man" is based on a note sequence from Variation 14.

Track listing 
 "Introduction"
 "Theme (Paganini Caprice in A minor No. 24) and Variations 1-4"
 "Variations 5 and 6"
 "Variation 7"
 "Variation 8"
 "Variation 9"
 "Variation 10"
 "Variations 11-15 (including the Tributes to Hank Marvin and Prokofiev)"
 "Variation 16"
 "Variations 13-14 Varied" (listed as 14-15)
 "Variation 17"
 "Variation 18" (Rachmaninoff's Variation 18)
 "Variations 19, 20 and 5 Varied (listed as 6)"
 "Variations 21 and 22"
 "Variation 23"

Personnel 
Original rock version
 Julian Lloyd Webber – cello
 Gary Moore – Gibson Les Paul, Rickenbacker electric 12 string & Fender Stratocaster electric guitars, Guild acoustic guitar 
 Rod Argent – grand piano, synthesizers (Minimoog, Roland RS-202, Yamaha CS-80)
 Don Airey – grand piano, synthesizers (ARP Odyssey, Minimoog, Solina String Ensemble), Fender Rhodes electric piano
 Barbara Thompson – flute, alto flute, alto & tenor saxophone
 John Mole – Fender Precision Bass, Hayman fretless bass guitar
 Jon Hiseman – Arbiter Auto-Tune drums, Paiste cymbals & gongs, percussion

with additional performers
 Andrew Lloyd Webber – synthesizer
 Dave Caddick – piano
 Bill Le Sage – vibraphone
 Herbie Flowers – bass
 Phil Collins – drums, percussion

Orchestral version
 Julian Lloyd Webber – cello
 Lorin Maazel – conductor
 London Philharmonic Orchestra

See also 
 Rhapsody on a Theme of Paganini (written by Sergei Rachmaninoff in 1934)
 List of variations on a theme by another composer

References

External links 
 Live performance "Introduction and Variations I - IV" by Julian Lloyd Webber on YouTube
 Andrew Lloyd Webber - Variations (1978) album review by Bruce Eder, credits & releases at AllMusic
 Andrew Lloyd Webber - Variations (1978) album releases & credits at Discogs.com
 Andrew Lloyd Webber - Variations (1978) album to be listened as stream at Spotify.com
 James Ehnes: "Caprice No. 24 in A minor: Tema con variazioni, quasi presto" (written by Niccolò Paganini) to be listened as stream at Spotify.com
 Sarah Brightman - "Unexpected Song" to be listened as stream at Spotify.com

1978 albums
Andrew Lloyd Webber albums
Variations
Albums produced by Andrew Lloyd Webber